Jesse Duffy (March 24, 1894 – December 14, 1952), sometimes billed as J. A. Duffy, was an American serial screenwriter for Republic Pictures and Columbia Pictures during the 1940s. He also directed some of the "Mickey McGuire" series starring Mickey Rooney released by Post Pictures Corporation, and later distributed by Columbia.

External links

American male screenwriters
1894 births
1952 deaths
Burials at Hollywood Forever Cemetery
20th-century American male writers
20th-century American screenwriters